Richmond Spiders basketball may refer to either of the basketball teams that represent the University of Richmond:

Richmond Spiders men's basketball
Richmond Spiders women's basketball